Homeobox protein Hox-A6 is a protein that in humans is encoded by the HOXA6 gene.

Function 

In vertebrates, the genes encoding the class of transcription factors called homeobox genes are found in clusters named A, B, C, and D on four separate chromosomes. Expression of these proteins is spatially and temporally regulated during embryonic development. This gene is part of the A cluster on chromosome 7 and encodes a DNA-binding transcription factor which may regulate gene expression, morphogenesis, and differentiation.

Clinical significance

Leukemia 

HOXA6 was examined to be preferentially expressed in primitive cells (e.g. hematopoietic progenitor cells), under the regulation of growth factors and cell cycles. Interleukin 3 and all-trans retinoic acid were found to be the inducing factors that can stimulate the expression of HOXA6. In mitotic process, HOXA6 was mainly expressed in S-phase and G2M phase cells. Overexpression of HoxA6 increased proliferation but inhibited differentiation of multipotential stem cells in the process of hemopoiesis, even had the capacity to transform primary hematopoietic cells into immortal cell lines. Transplantation of these cell lines may cause acute myeloid leukemia in recipient animals. Also in patients with acute myeloid leukemia, HOXA6 expression was upregulated. The co-methylation of HOX genes, including HOXA6, leads to the dysfunction of tumor suppression genes by reducing gene expression. The methylation processes can be identified in adult chronic lymphocytic leukemia and childhood acute lymphocytic leukemia.

Glioblastoma 

HOXA6 may also contribute to the invasive tendency of glioblastoma multiforme cells. Suppressed expression of HOXA6 by introducing its antisense fragments can reduce the invasion of glioblastoma multiforme cells.

References

Further reading